Alessandro Berselli (born 20 September 1990) is an Italian professional footballer who plays for Valenzana on loan from Parma.

References

1990 births
Living people
Parma Calcio 1913 players
Valenzana Mado players
Italian footballers
Association football defenders
Sportspeople from Reggio Emilia
Footballers from Emilia-Romagna